The Menominee River is an  tributary of the Mississippi River, which it joins in Jo Daviess County, Illinois.

The name "Menominee" refers to the Menominee, a Native American people. The name means "good seed" or "wild rice".

The Menominee rises in Grant County, Wisconsin at the confluence of Louisburg and Kieler creeks one mile south of Kieler just east of U.S. Route 151 and flows south past Sandy Hook and enters Illinois just south of Wisconsin Highway 11. It continues south through the northwestern corner of Illinois for about four miles before reaching its confluence with the Mississippi River after crossing under U.S. Route 20.

The river is part of the Driftless Area of Illinois and Wisconsin, a region that remained ice-free during the last ice age.

See also
List of Illinois rivers
List of Wisconsin rivers

References

External links
Prairie Rivers Network

Rivers of Illinois
Rivers of Wisconsin
Tributaries of the Mississippi River
Rivers of Jo Daviess County, Illinois
Driftless Area
Rivers of Grant County, Wisconsin